Phyllonorycter matsudai is a moth of the family Gracillariidae. It is known from the islands of Hokkaidō and Honshū in Japan and from the Russian Far East.

The larvae feed on Quercus crispula and Quercus mongolica. They mine the leaves of their host plant.

References

matsudai
Moths of Japan
Moths of Asia
Moths described in 1986